The 1998–99 season, was the Guildford Flames' seventh year of ice hockey. The Guildford Flames competed in the British National League.

The Guildford Flames continued on from the previous season with 'Inferno' a weekly television show that aired on ONTV CableTel. The show aired on Friday nights from 6-8pm and featured exclusive TV coverage of all Guildford Flames' BNL home fixtures, with commentary from Fred Perlini and Andy Sparks.

The highlight of Guildford's season was their Benson & Hedges Plate final victory over the Telford Tigers in December 1998. The New Year brought bad luck for the Flames as in January 1999 the club crashed to defeat in both legs of their Christmas Cup semi-final against the Peterborough Pirates and lost netminder Jamey Organ for the remainder of the season after he suffered a double break in an ankle.

Player statistics

Netminders

Schedule And Results

Regular season

Play-offs

External links 
 Official Guildford Flames website

References 

Guildford Flames seasons
1998–99 in English ice hockey